Big City Nights may refer to:

 "Big City Nights" (song), a 1984 song by the German heavy metal band Scorpions
 Big City Nights (Scorpions album), 1998
 Big City Nights (Space Cowboy album), 2005
 Big City Nights, the title of the music video for Daft Punk's song Da Funk